Alphington Grammar School is an independent, co-educational secondary school located in Alphington, Victoria, Australia, established by the Orthodox Community of Melbourne in 1988.

The school was designed to reflect the cultural diversity of Melbourne, and is non-denominational with students from  around 25 ethnic and religious backgrounds.

History 
Alphington Grammar School was established by the Greek Orthodox Community of Melbourne in 1989, the campus having previously been Parade College.

The Greek community of Melbourne is supportive of the school and holds its Greek language classes on campus on Friday evenings as well as weekends.

Alphington Grammar marked their 30 Year Anniversary on the 1st of March 2019 with a celebratory Gala for the staff and families and a Twilight Festival on campus for students and alumni.

In 2022 Alphington Grammar came into conflict with the City of Yarra over the illegal erection of gates across Old Heidelberg Road which the school had used to block community access to public land on Darebin Creek. During community consultation the City of Yarra council received more than 300 submissions for opening the road, and only 14 against. Alphington Grammar was initially ordered to remove the gates preventing public access to public land by the 16th of May, but refused to do so. An extended deadline of the 24th of May was offered, and upon its expiry council workers removed the gate. In response to the removal of the gate, Alphington Grammar quickly erected a temporary replacement gate. This gate was removed on the same day by a member of the public with an angle grinder in broad daylight.

Sport 
Alphington Grammar is a member of the Eastern Independent Schools of Melbourne (EISM).

EISM Premierships 
Alphington Grammar has won the following EISM senior premierships.

Combined:

 Cross Country - 2013

Boys:

 Basketball - 2014
 Cross Country - 2013
 Football (2) - 2002, 2003
 Football 12's - 2017
 Hockey - 2005
 Soccer (6) - 2001, 2002, 2003, 2011, 2012, 2018
Soccer five-a-side (3) - 2015, 2017, 2018
 Table Tennis (3) - 2015, 2016, 2017
 Tennis (5) - 2005, 2006, 2017, 2018, 2020
 Volleyball (4) - 2014, 2018, 2019, 2020

Girls:

 Netball (2) - 2016, 2019
 Soccer (3) - 2013, 2017, 2018
Soccer five-a-side - 2015
 Softball - 2004
 Tennis - 2009
 Volleyball (2) - 2014, 2020

References

External links
Alphington Grammar School website

Educational institutions established in 1989
Grammar schools in Australia
Private secondary schools in Victoria (Australia)
1989 establishments in Australia
Buildings and structures in the City of Banyule